George Fred Gillpatrick (February 28, 1875 – December 14, 1941) was a pitcher in Major League Baseball who played for the St. Louis Browns of the National League during the  season. He was born in Holden, Missouri. Batting side is unknown.
 
In a one-season career, Gillpatrick posted a 0–2 record with a 6.94 ERA in seven appearances, including three starts and one complete game, giving up 38 runs (27 earned) on 42 hits and 19 walks while striking out 12 in 35.0 innings of work. 
 
Gillpatrick died in Kansas City, Missouri, at the age of 66.

External links
Baseball Reference
Retrosheet

St. Louis Browns (NL) players
19th-century baseball players
Major League Baseball pitchers
Baseball players from Missouri
1875 births
1941 deaths
Morrilton Cotton Pickers players
Sherman Orphans players
Fort Worth Panthers players
Richmond Bluebirds players
San Antonio Missionaries players
Columbus Buckeyes (minor league) players
Columbus Senators players
Grand Rapids Furnituremakers players
Dayton Veterans players
People from Holden, Missouri
Iola Gasbags players